Why Bother At All is the second EP by American indie rock band Koufax. It was released in 2005 on Motor Music.

The song Why Bother at All was recorded for the album Hard Times Are In Fashion. It was also released as a CD-Single and as a 7" red translucent vinyl promo-single The first three songs were recorded in August 2004 at the  Black Lodge Eudora-Studios in Kansas. Only the Joe Jackson-song Look Sharp was recorded in March 2003 at The Loft-Studio in Saline, Michigan.

Track listing 
All tracks are written by Robert Suchan except as noted.

EP Version

 "Why Bother at All"  – 3:16
 "Call the Cops"  – 2:39
 "Loveless Meredith"  – 3:02
 "Look Sharp" (Joe Jackson) – 2:42

CD single

"Why Bother at All"  – 3:16
 "Call the Cops"  – 2:39
 "Loveless Meredith"  – 3:02

7" vinyl single (promo only)

"Why Bother at All"  – 3:16
 "Call the Cops"  – 2:39

Music video 
The music video was directed by Uwe Flade and shows the band playing in grey overalls in front of an art-screen-animation.

Personnel 
Band

 Robert Suchan – vocals, guitar, piano
 Jared Rosenberg – piano, organ, keyboards
 Ben Force  – guitars, bass, background vocals
Rob Pope  – bass, guitars, background vocals
Ryan Pope – drums, percussion

Technical

 Michael Krassner – production, recording (Tracks 1-3)

References

External links 
Why Bother at All on Youtube

2006 EPs
Koufax (band) albums